James Salmond may refer to:
 James Salmond (general) (1766–1837), officer in the East India Company's forces
 James Salmond (minister) (1898–1976), New Zealand teacher, Presbyterian minister and religious educationalist
 J. Louis Salmond (James Louis Salmond, 1868–1950), English-born architect active in New Zealand
 J. B. Salmond (James Bell Salmond, 1891–1958), Scottish journalist, poet and novelist

See also
 James Salmon (disambiguation)